Lipnica  is a village in Gmina Lipnica, Bytów County, Pomeranian Voivodeship, in northern Poland.

Lipnica is the seat of the Gmina Lipnica.

From 1975 to 1998 the village was in Słupsk Voivodeship. 

It has a population of 747.

Transport
Lipnica lies on voivodeship road 212.

References

Map of the Gmina Lipnica

Lipnica
Pomeranian Voivodeship (1919–1939)